Östra hamnen ("Eastern Harbour") is a neighbourhood of Malmö, situated in the Borough of Centrum, Malmö Municipality, Skåne County, Sweden.

References

Neighbourhoods of Malmö

sv:Malmö hamn#Östra hamnen